East Lake Weir is an unincorporated community in eastern Marion County, Florida, United States, on the east shore of Lake Weir. The community is part of the Ocala Metropolitan Statistical Area.  The ZIP Code for East Lake Weir is 32133.

Geography

See also

References

External links
The East Lake Weir Association, Inc

Unincorporated communities in Marion County, Florida
Unincorporated communities in Florida